The John McLoughlin Bridge is a tied-arch bridge that spans the Clackamas River between Oregon City and Gladstone, Oregon, in the northwest United States.  It was designed by Conde McCullough, and named for Dr. John McLoughlin.

The deck carries four lanes (two in each direction) of Oregon Route 99E, also known locally as McLoughlin Boulevard.

The bridge won the American Institute of Steel Construction's title of "Most Beautiful Steel Bridge" constructed in 1933. Originally painted black, it was painted "ODOT Green" soon after, the first time that specific color was used on a bridge.

Sources

Elegant Arches, Soaring Spans: C.B. McCulough, Oregon's Master Bridge Builder, Robert W. Hadlow, Oregon State University Press, 2001. .

External links
 

Buildings and structures in Oregon City, Oregon
Bridges completed in 1933
U.S. Route 99
Bridges in Clackamas County, Oregon
Tied arch bridges in the United States
Road bridges in Oregon
Bridges by Conde McCullough
1933 establishments in Oregon
Gladstone, Oregon
Bridges of the United States Numbered Highway System
Steel bridges in the United States